('Five Rabbit'; from Classical Nahuatl: , 'five' + , 'rabbit') is one of the five deities from Aztec and other central Mexican pre-Columbian mythological traditions who, known collectively as the , symbolized excess, over-indulgence and the attendant punishments and consequences thereof.

Postclassic central Mexican traditions identified rabbits with the beverage  and insobriety, and by extension  had a particular association with inebriation and excessive consumption.

See also
 , Two Rabbit, master of the 
 , foremost of the  Gods
 , a  god associated with Tepoztlán
 
 Aztec mythology

Notes

References
 
  
 
  
 

Aztec pulque gods
Mythological rabbits and hares
Alcohol deities